The 1959 South Dakota State Jackrabbits football team was an American football team that represented South Dakota State University in the North Central Conference during the 1959 NCAA College Division football season. In its 13th season under head coach Ralph Ginn, the team compiled a 2–7 record, finished in sixth place out of seven teams in the NCC, and was outscored by a total of 153 to 80.

Schedule

References

South Dakota State
South Dakota State Jackrabbits football seasons
South Dakota State Jackrabbits football